Edgar "Gar" Moon (3 December 1904 – 26 May 1976) was a tennis player from Australia who was best known for winning the 1930 Australian Championships – Men's singles title. He also won the 1932 Men's Doubles title with Jack Crawford. He won all three Men's titles at the Australian Championships.

Moon was introduced to tennis by his parents at an early age. He went to the Brisbane Grammar School where he was encouraged to play cricket but he preferred to play tennis on his parents' clay court. Moon was largely self-taught and practised his skills playing against family in Cabooltura where his father had a dairy farm. Moon was tall and strong and had good technique, but lacked dedication to the game.

Moon won his first national title at the 1929 Open when he teamed up with Daphne Akhurst to win the mixed doubles championship. In 1934, he won the Mixed Doubles title for a second time with partner Joan Hartigan.

In 1930, Moon won the Australian Open men's singles championship defeating Harry Hopman in the final 6–3, 6–1, 6–3. In 1932 the native of Queensland completed the triple, capturing the men's doubles title with partner Jack Crawford.

He played in two Davis Cup ties for the Australia Davis Cup team in 1930, against Switzerland and Ireland, and won all four of his singles matches.

Moon enlisted in the Australian Army on 17 March 1942 and reached the rank of corporal. He was discharged on 12 November 1945.

Grand Slam finals

Singles (1 win)

Doubles (1 win, 3 losses)

Mixed Doubles (2 wins, 1 loss)

References

External links
 
 
 

Australian Championships (tennis) champions
Australian male tennis players
Tennis people from New South Wales
Tennis people from Queensland
1904 births
1976 deaths
Grand Slam (tennis) champions in men's singles
Grand Slam (tennis) champions in mixed doubles
Grand Slam (tennis) champions in men's doubles
Grand Slam (tennis) champions in boys' doubles
Australian Championships (tennis) junior champions